The Kedermister Library, at Langley near Slough in the English county of Berkshire (formerly Buckinghamshire), is a rare surviving example of an early 17th-century parish library, preserved in situ in the decorated cupboards designed for it in 1620 in the parish church of St Mary the Virgin.

The original vellum catalogue dated in 1638, is still hanging in the library.

Founded around 1613 by Sir John Kedermister (d. 1631), it was established to provide for the education of the rector of St. Mary's, and presented to the church in perpetuity by Sir John. A catalogue of the Library listing 307 volumes survives from 1638.

A large portion of the library still exists and, with the contemporary catalogue, provides insight into scholarship and book collecting in the 17th century.

The library is only open from June-September by appointment only.

Two of the Library's treasures, the Kedermister Gospels (an 11th-century illuminated manuscript) and the Pharmacopolium or a booke of Medicine (a manuscript herbal of 1630) are on permanent deposit in the British Library.

Langley, also known as Langley Marish, was formerly in the county of Buckinghamshire, and the Kedermister Library is overseen by Buckinghamshire County Council and governed by a charitable trust.

The name Kedermister is the most commonly used, though some sources, including the charity governing the library, use the spelling Kederminster.

Further information
Jane Francis: The Kedermister Library: an account of its origins and a reconstruction of its contents and arrangement; Records of Buckinghamshire Volume 36 1994 pp. 62–85; ISSN 0967-2885

See also
Francis Trigge Chained Library

References

External links
Kedermister Library website at Centre for Buckinghamshire Studies (NB: using the spelling Kederminster)
Slough History Online: Kedermister Library
Kedermister Library website

1613 establishments in England
Buildings and structures in Slough
History of Buckinghamshire
Libraries in Berkshire